Firefox Focus is a free and open-source privacy-focused mobile browser based on Firefox from Mozilla, available for Android and iOS smartphones and tablets. Firefox Focus was initially a tracker-blocking application for mobile iOS devices, released in December 2015. It was developed into a minimalistic web browser shortly afterwards. However, it can still work solely as a tracking-blocker in the background of the Safari browser on Apple devices.

In June 2017, the first release for Android went public and was downloaded over one million times in the first month. As of January 2017, it is available in 27 languages. Since July 2018, Firefox Focus is preinstalled on the BlackBerry Key2 as part of the application Locker.

To bypass content-blocker restrictions from Apple, Firefox Focus uses the UIWebView API on iOS devices. On Android, it used the Blink engine in version 6.x and earlier, and it has used GeckoView since version 7.0.

Tracking protection 
Firefox Focus is designed to block online trackers, including third-party advertising, with the end goal of both improving browsing speed and protecting users' privacy. Content blocking is achieved using the Disconnect block lists. The blocking of third-party trackers (except "other content trackers") is enabled by default. In the other Firefox browsers, users have to enable the tracking protection feature inside the browser preferences manually. Users can also view types of trackers on a page by tapping on the shield icon next to the URL bar. A panel will pop-up and shows what kind of trackers are on that page: ad trackers, analytics trackers, social trackers or content trackers.

On December 20, 2018, Mozilla announced that Firefox Focus now checks all URLs against the Google Safe Browsing service to help prevent people from accessing fraudulent sites.

Functions 
Firefox Focus can be set as content-blocker in the Safari web browser options. After activating the Safari integration in the Firefox Focus settings, it will disable trackers automatically in the background when browsing using the Safari browser.

Pressing the trash icon while browsing will delete all session data and refer to the startscreen, that is displaying the customisable search bar. Tabs can be opened by long-pressing a URL on a website. Favourite links can be set on the homescreen of the device.

Firefox Focus contains a option called telemetry. By activating it, users can allow Mozilla to collect and receive non personal-identifiable information to improve Firefox. Due to privacy concerns, telemetry of Firefox Klar is disabled by default.

October 15, 2018, Mozilla announced that Firefox Focus is being updated with a new search feature and visual design. That means the browser will conceptually tell users about its features and options.

Minimum device requirements

Apple mobile devices 
There are some minimum hardware requirements to remove tracking contents. The mechanism needs hardware that can handle the extra load of content blocking so it only works on 64-bit devices running iOS 9 and above including:

 iPhone 5s and newer
 iPad Air and newer
 iPad mini 2 and newer
 iPod touch from the 6th generation

, iOS 11.4 or above is required to download Firefox Focus on the App Store.

Android mobile devices 
Android version 5.0 or higher is required to use the latest version of Firefox Focus.

Firefox Klar 
"Firefox Klar" is the modified version with telemetry disabled released for German-speaking countries in order to avoid the ambiguity with the German news magazine FOCUS.

Gallery

See also 

 Firefox, the desktop web browser
 Firefox for Android, a project for Android smartphones and tablet computers
 Firefox for iOS, a project for iOS smartphones and tablets
 Safari, the default web browser for iOS
 Mobile browser

References

External links 
 
 Firefox Focus for iOS on the App Store
 Firefox Focus for Android on Google Play
 Firefox Klar for Android  on F-Droid

Firefox
2016 software
Android (operating system) software
BlackBerry software
Free and open-source Android software
Free multilingual software
Free software programmed in Objective-C
Free software programmed in Swift
Free web browsers
IOS software
IOS web browsers
Mobile web browsers
Software using the Mozilla license
Web browsers based on Firefox